Sucessos Inesquecíveis de Elis Regina is a five-disc CD-set of songs performed by Brazilian singer Elis Regina, including compositions by Milton Nascimento, Gilberto Gil, Rita Lee, Tom Jobim, Belchior, João Bosco, Ary Barroso, Ivan Lins, and Carlos Lyra. The choice of songs was based on recommendations by some 8,000 subscribers of the magazine "Seleções" (released by the Brazilian branch of Reader's Digest) and numerous musicians. Each disc follows a certain theme as indicated by the title for each.

Track listing

Disc 1 – Nasce Uma Estrela 
Arrastão (Live)
Upa, Neguinho
Corrida de Jangada
Casa Forte
Canto de Ossanha
Andança
Vida de Bailarina
Reza
Da Cor do Pecado
Vera Cruz
Zazueira
Black is Beautiful
Vou Deitar e Rolar
Ladeira da Preguiça

Disc 2 – Elis Romântica 
Me Deixa Louca (Me Vuelves Loco)
Preciso Aprender a Ser Só
Carinhoso
É Com Esse Que Eu Vou
Você
Modinha
Cais
Na Batucada da Vida
Boa Noite, Amor
O Que Tinha de Ser
Samba do Perdão
Folhas Secas
Pra Dizer Adeus
Estrada so Sol

Disc 3 – Grandes Sucessos 
Aprendendo a Jogar
Casa no Campo
Fascinação
Madalena
Nada Será Como Antes
O Meste Sala Dos Mares
Travessia
Me Deixa em Paz
Romaria
Atrás da Porta
Canção do Sol
Dois Pra lá, Dois Pra cá
Cartomante
Redescobrir

Disc 4 – Sambas e Outras Bossas 
O Barquinho
Saudosa Maloca (Live)
Falei e Disse
Bala com Bala
Amor Até o Fim
Meio de Campo
Marcha da Quarta-feira de Cinzas (Live)
O Rancho da Goiabada - Construção (Live)
Morro Velho
Dinorah, Dinorah
Conversando no Bar
20 Anos Blue
Aquarela do Brasil - Nega do Cabelo Duro
Sinal Fechado

Disc 5 – Elis Total 
Alô, Alô Marciano
o Bêbado e o Equilibrista
Como Nossos Pais
Ponta de Areia
Caxangá
Querelas do Brasil (Live)
Agnus Sei
Velha Roupa Colorida
Águas de Março
Menino das Laranjas
O Que Foi Feito Devera (De Vera)
These Are the Songs (Esta é a Canção)
Aquele Abraço (Live)
Tiro ao Álvaro

Elis Regina albums
2001 compilation albums